Gafoor Y. Elliyaas (born 2 February 1989) is an Indian film director from the Malayalam film industry.

Personal life
Gafoor Y. Elliyaas was born in Alappuzha as the younger son of Elliyaas.

Filmography

References

External links
 

1987 births
Malayalam film directors
Living people
Film directors from Kerala
Artists from Alappuzha